Old Woodruff High School is a historic high school building located at Woodruff, Spartanburg County, South Carolina.  It was built in 1925, and is a two-story, modified "H" plan stuccoed masonry building in the Collegiate Gothic style.  It consists of a three-part center section with two perpendicular wings.  The building has a flat roof with parapet, Gothic arches, recessed entrances framed by pointed arches. The building housed a high school until 1953 when Woodruff High School was constructed, then used as a middle school and later an elementary school. In 1978 the City of Woodruff acquired old Woodruff High School and adapted it for use as its city hall and police headquarters.

It was listed on the National Register of Historic Places in 2006.

References

School buildings on the National Register of Historic Places in South Carolina
School buildings completed in 1915
High schools in South Carolina
Buildings and structures in Spartanburg County, South Carolina
National Register of Historic Places in Spartanburg County, South Carolina
1915 establishments in South Carolina